Pyrus nivalis, commonly known as yellow pear or snow pear, is a species of tree in the family Rosaceae that grows naturally from South-East Europe to Western Asia. Like most pears, its fruit can be eaten raw or cooked; it has a mild sour taste. The plant is very colorful and may grow up to 10 meters tall and 8 meters wide. It is a very hardy plant that is able to survive with a small supply of water and can brave very high/low temperatures. It may hybridize with other pears, producing, for example, Pyrus austriaca in a cross with Pyrus pyraster.

References

External links
Information from Plants for a Future database
Description of the Plant from Plants for a Future
Physical Appearance at plantpress.com

Pears
nivalis